Pirate radio is illegal or unregulated radio transmission.

Pirate Radio may also refer to:

 "Pirate Radio", a 2004 album by Mars Ill
 "Pirate Radio", a 2005 episode of Danny Phantom
 Pirate Radio (box set), a 2006 compilation album by The Pretenders
 Pirate Radio or The Boat That Rocked, a 2009 British film
 KQLZ (100.3 FM), a licensed radio station that marketed itself as "Pirate Radio" from 1989 to 1992, now known as KKLQ
 WSOU (89.5 FM) at Seton Hall University, known as "Pirate Radio" after the school's athletic teams

See also 
 Pirate Radio Four, a 1980s BBC Radio 4 program
 Pirate Radio USA, a 2005 documentary film
 Pirate FM, a British broadcaster covering Cornwall and west Devon